Jorge Camacho may refer to:

Jorge Camacho (footballer)
Jorge Camacho (painter) (1934–2011), Cuban realist painter
Jorge Camacho (writer) (born 1966), Spanish writer in Esperanto and Spanish

See also 
 Camacho